Eduard is a male given name, which is a German and Dutch form of the English name Edward. Notable persons with that name include (in alphabetical order):

Eduard Ahrens (1803–1863), Estonian linguist and clergyman
Eduard Alayev (born 1967), Israeli Olympic sport shooter
Eduard Georg Aule (1878–1947), Estonian banker and politician
Eduard Buchner (1860–1917), German chemist and zymologist
Eduard Caudella (1841–1924), Romanian opera composer,  violinist, conductor, teacher and critic
Eduard Čech (1893–1960), Czech mathematician
Eduard Clam-Gallas (1805–1891), Austrian general
Eduard Cristian Zimmermann (born 1983), Romanian footballer
Eduard Dietl (1890–1944), German World War II general
Eduard Einstein (1910–1965), second son of physicist Albert Einstein
Eduard Grosu (born 1980), Moldovan footballer
Eduard Hellvig (born 1974), Romanian political scientist, journalist and politician
Eduard Hiiop (1889–1941), Estonian figure skater and pair skater 
Eduard Iordănescu (born 1978), Romanian footballer and coach
Eduard Kansma (1887–1946), Estonian politician
Eduard Khil (1934-2012), Russian singer
Eduard Kolmanovsky (1923–1994), Soviet composer
Eduard Kõppo (1894–1966), Estonian sports figure
Eduard Krebsbach (1894–1947), German SS doctor in Nazi Mauthausen concentration camp executed for war crimes
Eduard Kunz (born 1980), Russian pianist 
Eduard Limonov (1943-2020), Russian writer
Eduard Looijenga (born 1948), Dutch mathematician
Eduard Meron (born 1938), Arab-Israeli Olympic weightlifter
Eduard Mușuc (born 1975), Moldovan politician
Eduard Pană (born 1944), Romanian ice hockey player
Eduard Pap (born 1994) Romanian footballer 
Eduard Prugovečki (1937–2003), Canadian physicist and mathematician
Eduard Pütsep (1898–1960), Estonian wrestler
Eduard Ratnikov (born 1983), Estonian footballer
Eduard Roschmann (1908–1977), Austrian Nazi SS Riga ghetto commandant
Eduard Selling (1834–1920), German mathematician and inventor of calculating machines
Eduard Shevardnadze (1928–2014), Georgian politician and diplomat
Eduard Skrzipek, (1917–1945), Hauptmann in the Luftwaffe during World War II
Eduard Stăncioiu (born 1981), Romanian footballer
Eduard Streltsov (1937–1990), Soviet footballer
Eduard Tișmănaru (born 1987), Romanian footballer
Eduard Tratt (1919–1944), Luftwaffe fighter, test pilot and flying ace of World War II
Eduard Uspensky (1937–2018), Soviet and Russian children's writer and poet, author of over 70 books, as well as a playwright, screenwriter and TV presenter
Eduard Văluță (born 1979), Moldovan footballer
Eduard Vinokurov (1942–2010), Kazakh-born Soviet Olympic and world champion fencer
Eduard von Simson (1810-1899), German jurist and President of the German Parliament
Eduard Weiter (1889–1945), German SS concentration camp commandant
Eduard Weitz (born 1946), Israeli Olympic weightlifter
Eduard Zorn (1901–1945), Generalmajor in the Wehrmacht during World War II

See also
 
 Edward
 Édouard
 Eduardo
 Eduards

References

Romanian masculine given names
Russian masculine given names
Czech masculine given names
Slovak masculine given names
Croatian masculine given names
Dutch masculine given names
Estonian masculine given names